
This is a list of postal codes in Canada where the first letter is X. Postal codes beginning with X are located within the Canadian territories of Nunavut and the Northwest Territories. Only the first three characters are listed, corresponding to the Forward Sortation Area.

Canada Post provides a free postal code look-up tool on its website, and its mobile applications. Many vendors also sell validation tools, which allow customers to properly match addresses and postal codes. Hard-copy directories can also be consulted in all post offices, and some libraries.

Nunavut and the Northwest Territories - 6 FSAs

References

Communications in Nunavut
Communications in the Northwest Territories
X
Postal codes
Postal codes